Rushan may refer to:

Rushan, Shandong, a county-level city of Weihai, Shandong, China
Ruşan, also known as Rushan, a village and municipality in the Ismailli Rayon of Azerbaijan
Rushan Range, a mountain range in south-western Pamir in Tajikistan
Rushan cheese, cow's milk cheese of Yunnan, China
Rushan (name)
Rūshān, mashrabiya, a type of projecting window characteristic of traditional architecture in the Islamic world
Rushan people, a Iranic-Pamiri ethno-linguistic group of people

See also 
Rushon District, Gorno-Badakhshan Autonomous Province, Tajikistan
Rushon or Rushan, the capital town of the district